Yang Dong-geun (born June 1, 1979) or YDG is a South Korean actor, rapper, singer-songwriter, record producer, and breakdancer. Yang majored in Theatrical Performance at Yong-In University.

Biography
Yang enlisted for mandatory military service in May 2008 for 21 months of active duty. During which time he starred in military musical, Mine with Kangta. It is about the true life story of Lieutenant Lee Jong-myung, who lost his legs in a land mine explosion near the demilitarized zone, in June 2000, when he saved fellow soldier, Sul Dong-seob from the minefield.

Yang and his wife Park Ga-ram have two sons and a daughter. Their daughter Joy has appeared on The Return of Superman along with the daughters of actors In Gyo-jin and Oh Ji-ho.

Career
His comeback project after being discharged from the military was in film Grand Prix with Kim Tae-hee. He was cast as male lead Lee Woo-suk after Lee Joon-gi had to pull out when the Military Manpower Administration declined his application to postpone enlistment for military service. He joined as a member of KBS variety show The Return of Superman with his daughter Yang Joy in 2016.

Philanthropy 
On February 8, 2023, Yang donated 10 million won to help 2023 Turkey–Syria earthquake, by donating money through the Embassy of Turkey in South Korea.

Filmography

Television series

Web series

Film

Variety shows

Theatre

Ambassadorship 
 Public relations ambassador of the global medical volunteer group Green Doctors (2022)

Awards and nominations

References

External links 

South Korean male rappers
South Korean singer-songwriters
South Korean record producers
South Korean breakdancers
South Korean male stage actors
South Korean male film actors
South Korean male television actors
South Korean male child actors
Yong In University alumni
Male actors from Seoul
Rappers from Seoul
Brand New Music artists
1979 births
Living people
Kyungbock High School alumni
South Korean male singer-songwriters
Best New Actor Paeksang Arts Award (television) winners